Bush Hill is a suburb of Johannesburg, South Africa. It is located in Region 3 and Region 5.

References

Johannesburg Region C